Short Stories is the third studio album by the American singer-songwriter Harry Chapin, released in 1973. (see 1973 in music). "W.O.L.D.", "Mr Tanner" and "Mail Order Annie" remained amongst his most popular works for the rest of his life. "W.O.L.D." went to number 36 on the Billboard Hot 100 chart and had commercial success in the top 10 in other countries such as Canada.

Track listing

Personnel
Harry Chapin – guitar, vocals
Dave Armstrong – harmonica
Tomi Lee Bradley – vocals
Bobby Carlin – drums
Jeanne French – vocals
Paul Leka – keyboards
Michael Masters – cello
Ronald Palmer – guitar, vocals
Buddy Saltzman – drums
John Wallace – bass guitar, vocals
Tim Scott – cello

Charts and certifications

Charts

Certifications

References

1973 albums
Harry Chapin albums
Albums produced by Paul Leka
Elektra Records albums